Bamboes Spruit, also known as Bamboesspruit, is a river in the North West province of South Africa. It is a tributary of the large Vaal River, emptying into the Bloemhof Dam.

See also
 List of reservoirs and dams in South Africa
 List of rivers of South Africa

References 
  from e-wise
 List of South African Dams from the Department of Water Affairs and Forestry (South Africa)

Rivers of North West (South African province)